2001 Harrah's 500 may refer to;

 2001 Harrah's 500 (CART)
 2001 Harrah's 500 (NASCAR)

Disambiguation pages